The Dictionary of Obscure Sorrows is a website and YouTube channel, created by John Koenig, that coins and defines neologisms for emotions that do not have a descriptive term. The dictionary includes verbal entries on the website with paragraph-length descriptions and videos on YouTube for individual entries. The neologisms, while completely created by Koenig, are based on his research on etymologies and meanings of used prefixes, suffixes, and word roots. The terms are often based on "feelings of existentialism" and are meant to "fill a hole in the language", often from reader contributions of specific emotions. Some videos involve a large number of photographs, such as the video for Vemödalen, which uses an "almost exhausting—yet seamless—fusion of 465 similar photos from different photographers". Other videos are more personal, such as Avenoir, which involves a "collage of his own home movies to piece together an exploration of life’s linearity".

An official book for the Dictionary of Obscure Sorrows was released by Simon & Schuster on November 16, 2021.

History
The dictionary was first considered in 2006 when Koenig was studying at Macalester College, Minnesota and attempting to write poetry. The Dictionary of Obscure Sorrows was the idea he came up with that would contain all the words he needed for his poetry, including emotions that had never been linguistically described. The popularity of the website and web series began to grow in June 2015 after a list of twenty-three words from the dictionary began to be shared on multiple social media sites.

Notable words

Several of the neologisms presented in The Dictionary of Obscure Sorrows, especially those that have an accompanying video, have received attention and interest. The term Vemödalen focuses on the lack of creativity within photography due to the existence of similar photographs having been taken in the past. However, the video also focuses on how it is "inevitable that the "same" image will be captured by different individuals" while it is also correct that "just because some things seem similar, their uniqueness is not annulled". Using a quote from Walt Whitman, the video points out that something being unique will always be based on adding to what came before and that every photo ever made is being added to the story of photographs that all people are collaborating on.

The term Sonder has been noted as well for its relation to other people, its definition meaning "the realization that each random passerby is living a life as vivid and complex as your own". Sonder has also been appropriated by various companies for use such as the name of a bike brand and a mental therapy marketplace, Sondermind, as well as the title of a video game. The third album from indie pop artist Kaoru Ishibashi was named Sonderlust after this term from the dictionary and references the separation from his wife and his attempts to understand her life. Sonder is the fourth studio album by English progressive metal band TesseracT. Sonder is the second studio album by American pop-rock band The Wrecks.

Multiple words from the dictionary, such as ellipsism, énouement, and onism, were used as titles for various cocktails served at the Chicago restaurant Knife. Similarly, an art gallery exhibit for the works of Michael Sagato in Los Angeles uses words from the Dictionary of Obscure Sorrows to title each of his art pieces and to reference the meaning behind each piece.

Critical reception
The Times of India referred to the dictionary as a "delightful website for etymologists and wordsmiths". Sharanya Manivannan, writing for The New Indian Express, described the dictionary as a "beautiful experiment on the fine line between babble and Babel." Eley Williams, writing for The Guardian on the topic of fictional dictionaries, described Koenig's project as "by turns stirring and playful, providing lexical and linguistic plugs for the lacunae of everyday expression".

References

Further reading

External links
 Official website
 The Dictionary of Obscure Sorrows on YouTube

2014 web series debuts
American non-fiction web series
Internet culture
Online English dictionaries
Internet properties established in 2009